Maganjić is a Croatian surname. Notable people with the surname include:

Josip Maganjić (born 1999), Croatian football forward
Milijana Maganjić (born 1981), Croatian basketball player

Croatian surnames